This is a list of films about food and drink.

Films about food and drink

Documentary films

  All in This Tea
  American Beer
  Bananas!*
  Barolo Boys
  Beer Wars
  Bill W.
  The Birth of Saké
  A Bite of China
  Black Coffee
  Black Gold
  Blood into Wine
  The Cheese Mites
  Chef Thémis, cuisinier sans frontières
  Chez Schwartz
  Le Cirque: A Table in Heaven
  The Delicacy
  Dive!
  Fat Head
  Fed Up
  Final Straw: Food, Earth, Happiness
  Fine Food, Fine Pastries, Open 6 to 9
  First We Eat
  The Five Obstructions
  Food - Weapon of Conquest
  Food, Inc.
  The Fruit Hunters
  Garlic Is as Good as Ten Mothers
  Gather
  Global Steak
  Gutbusters
  I Like Killing Flies
  Ingredients
  Jiro Dreams of Sushi
  Kings of Pastry
  Knife Skills
  Know Your Mushrooms
  A Matter of Taste
  Maxime, McDuff & McDo
  McLibel
  McMillions
  Meat the Future
  Mondovino
  Off the Menu: Asian America
  Off the Menu: The Last Days of Chasen's
  On the Trail with Miss Snail Pail
  Our Daily Bread
  Paavo, a Life in Five Courses
  Pennsylvania Diners and Other Roadside Restaurants
  Pet Fooled
  A Place at the Table
  The Price of Sugar
  Red Obsession
  The Restaurant Inspector
  Roadrunner: A Film About Anthony Bourdain
  The Search for General Tso
  Somm
  Somm 3
  Somm: Into the Bottle
  Soul Food Junkies
  Sour Grapes
  Sriracha
  State of Bacon
  A State of Vine
  The Sugar Babies
  Sugar: The Bitter Truth
  Super Size Me 
  Super Size Me 2: Holy Chicken!
  Terminal Bar
  That Sugar Film
  The Sugar Film
  Theater of Life
  They're Trying to Kill Us
  Unacceptable Levels
  Wine for the Confused
  Wolfgang

Vegetarianism

  Devour the Earth
  Earthlings
  Fat, Sick and Nearly Dead
  Food Matters
  Forks Over Knives
  Go Further
  Meet Your Meat
  Peaceable Kingdom
  Planeat
  A Sacred Duty
  Vegucated

Soft drinks

  Bosko's Soda Fountain
  The Coca-Cola Kid
  The Gods Must Be Crazy
  Lemonade Mouth
  One, Two, Three

Milk
  Vase de Noces

Coffee

  Barista
  Black Coffee
  Black Gold
  Café. Waiting. Love
  Christmas in July
  Cup of Love
  Killer Bean Forever

Alcohol

  The Angels' Share
  Another Round
  Felix Finds Out
  The Kitchen in Paris
  Lawless
  The Moonshiner
  Thunder and Lightning
  Thunder Road
  Whisky Galore!
  Whisky Galore! (2016)
  White Lightning

Beer

  American Beer
  Beer Wars
  Beerfest
  Un bon bock
  Cheer Boys Cheer
  Drinking Buddies
  The Fight with the Dragon
  The Frankenstein Brothers
  Krazy Kat Invalid
  Monks, Girls and Hungarian Soldiers
  Old Man Drinking a Glass of Beer
  Schwechater
  Smokey and the Bandit
  Song of the Eagle
  Strange Brew
  Take This Job and Shove It
  What! No Beer?
  The World's End

Wine

  At Sachem Farm
  Autumn Tale
  Back to Burgundy
  Barolo Boys
  The Birth of Saké
  Blood into Wine
  Bottle Shock
  The Enchanted Drawing
  Eye of the Devil
  Fine Gold
  German Wine
  A Good Year
  Laughing Heirs
  A Man About the House
  Mondovino
  A Perfect Pairing
  Les Raisins de la Mort
  Red Obsession
  Saint-Amour
  The Secret of Santa Vittoria
  Sideways
  Sideways (2009)
  Somm
  Somm 3
  Somm: Into the Bottle
  Sour Grapes
  A State of Vine
  Story of Wine
  Terroir
  This Earth Is Mine
  Uncorked
  Uncorked (2020)
  Vagabond
  The Vineyard
  A Walk in the Clouds
  Wine Country
  Wine for the Confused
  The Winemaker of Langenlois
  Year of the Comet

Restaurants

  Al Dente
  Always Be My Maybe
  The Automat
  Bella
  Betty Boop's Bizzy Bee
  Big Night
  The Big Restaurant
  The Bob's Burgers Movie
  Boiling Point
  Bon Appétit
  Bosko's Soda Fountain
  Bread and Tulips
  Bread of Happiness
  Burnt
  Cafe Isobe
  Camerieri
  Cheeni Kum
  Chef (2014)
  Chef (2017)
  The Chef (2012)
  Chef's Special
  Chicken and Duck Talk
  Choke
  Cocktail
  Collateral Damage
  La colmena
  Combination Platter
  Compliance
  The Cook, the Thief, His Wife & Her Lover
  Crossroads to Crime
  Diner
  The Dinner
  Dinner Rush
  Double Patty
  East Side Sushi
  Eat Drink Man Woman
  Eat Pray Love
  The Encounter
  Estômago
  Extreme Job
  Fat Head
  Fat Pizza
  Fat Pizza vs. Housos
  Food Luck
  The Founder
  Give Me a Book of Complaints
  The God of Ramen
  Good Burger
  Gravy
  Hash House Blues
  A Hound for Trouble
  The Hundred-Foot Journey
  I'm Livin' It
  Iamhere
  Izakaya Chōji
  Jadoo
  Jiro Dreams of Sushi
  Kamome Shokudo
  The Kitchen in Paris
  Krazy Kat & Ignatz Mouse Discuss the Letter 'G'
  Legion
  Let's Eat!
  Lights in the Dusk
  Little Italy
  Love's Kitchen
  Magic Kitchen
  Maska
  Maxime, McDuff & McDo
  McLibel
  McMillions
  Mediterranean Food
  Melvin Goes to Dinner
  The Menu (upcoming)
  Monsieur Albert
  Mostly Martha
  Murder Collection V.1
  My Breakfast with Blassie
  My Dinner with Andre
  Mystic Pizza
  Nina's Heavenly Delights
  No Reservations
  Oh Manapenne!
  Osaka Wrestling Restaurant
  The Other Side of Hope
  Pennsylvania Diners and Other Roadside Restaurants
  Perfect Sense
  The Petrified Forest
  Porky's Last Stand
  The Princess and the Frog
  Rare Birds
  Ratatouille
  Restaurant
  The Restaurant Inspector
  The Secret of the Grain
  Service for Ladies
  Service for Ladies (1932)
  The Slammin' Salmon
  Solino
  Soul Kitchen
  Spanglish
  Spanish Masala
  Spin
  The Spitfire Grill
  The SpongeBob Movie: Sponge on the Run
  The SpongeBob Movie: Sponge Out of Water
  The SpongeBob SquarePants Movie
  Still Waiting...
  Summer in Tyrol
  Super Size Me
  Super Size Me 2: Holy Chicken!
  Support the Girls
  Sweet Taste of Souls
  A Tale of Two Kitchens
  Tampopo
  Tick, Tick... Boom!
  Today's Special
  Tortilla Soup
  The Trip
  Trip for Tat
  Turbo
  Uncorked (2020)
  Ustad Hotel
  VFW
  Vienna Tales
  Waiter!
  Waitress
  Waiting...
  West Bank Story
  When You Comin' Back, Red Ryder?
  The White Horse Inn
  The White Horse Inn (1935)
  The White Horse Inn (1952)
  The White Horse Inn (1960)
  Woman on Top

Confectionery/Desserts

  An American Girl: Grace Stirs Up Success
  The Bakery Girl of Monceau
  Bosko's Soda Fountain
  A Boy and His Samurai
  The Cakemaker
  Charlie and the Chocolate Factory
  Chocolat
  The Cookie Carnival
  Dough
  The Ginger Bread Boy
  Hoodwinked!
  Hoodwinked Too! Hood vs. Evil
  Hop
  Ice Cream Man
  Just Desserts
  Kings of Pastry
  Lessons in Chocolate
  The Magic Pudding
  Merci pour le Chocolat
  Patisserie Coin de rue
  Ralph Breaks the Internet
  Romantics Anonymous
  Sweeney Todd: The Demon Barber of Fleet Street
  Sweet Bean
  Sweet Movie
  Tom and Jerry: Willy Wonka and the Chocolate Factory
  Unfrosted: The Pop-Tart Story (upcoming)
  Willy Wonka & the Chocolate Factory
  Wonka (upcoming)
  Wreck-It Ralph

Misc.

 7 chili in 7 giorni
 A Bug's Life
 April Maze
 Aqua Teen Forever: Plantasm (upcoming)
 Aqua Teen Hunger Force Colon Movie Film for Theaters
 The Attack of the Giant Moussaka
 Attack of the Killer Tomatoes
 Axone
 Banana Joe
 Bananas!*
 Basmati Blues
 Bee Movie
 Bhaji on the Beach
 Cloudy with a Chance of Meatballs
 Cloudy with a Chance of Meatballs 2
 Consumed
 Criminally Insane
 Criminally Insane 2
 Daisies
 Delicatessen
 The Discreet Charm of the Bourgeoisie
 Excess Flesh
 Fast Food Nation
 Feast
 Foodfight!
 Un gallo con muchos huevos
 The Gay Anties
 La Grande Bouffe
 How to Eat Fried Worms
 Killer Tomatoes Eat France!
 Killer Tomatoes Strike Back!
 Kushka
 Lemon
 Little Forest
 The Loser Takes It All
 The Lunchbox
 Morning Patrol
 Mozzarella Stories
 The Nuttiest Nutcracker
 Of Thee I Sting
 The Office Picnic
 Otra Película de Huevos y un Pollo
 Over the Hedge
 Una Película de Huevos
 Phantom Thread
 Picnic
 The Picnic
 Picnic at Hanging Rock
 The Platform
 Pop-Pie a la Mode
 The Private Life of Henry VIII
 Pup on a Picnic
 Un rescate de huevitos
 Return of the Killer Tomatoes!
 Sausage Party
 The Scarecrow
 Scooby-Doo! and the Gourmet Ghost
 Soylent Green
 Sreekaram
 State of Bacon
 The Taking of Power by Louis XIV
 Tea for Two Hundred
 Troll 2
 When Do We Eat?
 Yogi Bear

Feature films about cooking 

  Always Be My Maybe
  An American Girl: Grace Stirs Up Success
  As Needed
  Babette's Feast
  Barbie: A Fairy Secret
  Barbie: A Fashion Fairytale
  Bawarchi
  Big Night
  The Big Restaurant
  Bombay to Bangkok
  Bon Appétit
  Buried Seeds
  Burnt
  Cheeni Kum
  Chef (2014)
  Chef (2017)
  The Chef (2012)
  A Chef in Love
  Chef Thémis, cuisinier sans frontières
  Chef's Special
  The Chinese Feast
  Chocolat
  Cook Off!
  The Cook, the Thief, His Wife & Her Lover
  Cook Up a Storm
  Cooking with Stella
  The Dinner
  Dinner Rush
  Discopath
  Eat Drink Man Woman
  Eddie's Million Dollar Cook-Off
  Estômago
  A Feast at Midnight
  The Fighting Chefs
  Final Recipe
  Food Luck
  The French Dispatch
  Galpo Holeo Satti
  The God of Cookery
  The God of Ramen
  Gowdru Hotel
  Le Grand Chef
  Le Grand Chef 2: Kimchi Battle
  La Grande Bouffe
  The Green Butchers
  Gulabjaam (2018)
  Ham and Eggs
  Haute Cuisine
  The Hundred-Foot Journey
  Iamhere
  Jadoo
  Jeanne Dielman, 23 quai du Commerce, 1080 Bruxelles
  Jiro Dreams of Sushi
  Juanita
  Julia
  Julie & Julia
  Just Desserts
  Kings of Pastry
  The Kitchen in Paris
  Krazy Kat & Ignatz Mouse Discuss the Letter 'G'
  Kung Fu Chefs
  Kusina Kings
  Lessons in Chocolate
  Let's Eat!
  Like Water for Chocolate
  Little Forest
  Little Italy
  Love, Charlie: The Rise and Fall of Chef Charlie Trotter
  Love Khichdi
  Love's Kitchen
  Lunch Ladies
  Magic Kitchen
  A Matter of Taste
  Mediterranean Food
  Mostly Martha
  Mr. Church
  My Breakfast with Blassie
  My Dinner with Andre
  Nacho Libre
  Nina's Heavenly Delights
  No 73, Shanthi Nivasa
  No Reservations
  Now, Forager
  Oh Manapenne!
  Osaka Wrestling Restaurant
  Paavo, a Life in Five Courses
  Pelli Choopulu
  Perfect Sense
  Pieces of April
  Pig
  Por que Você Partiu?
  The Pot au Feu (upcoming)
  The Princess and the Frog
  The Ramen Girl
  Rasam
  Ratatouille
  Rosogolla
  Salaam Namaste
  Salt N' Pepper
  Scooby-Doo! and the Gourmet Ghost
  The Secret of the Grain
  Semiotics of the Kitchen
  Server Sundaram (not released)
  Shogun and Little Kitchen
  Simply Irresistible
  The Slammin' Salmon
  Soul Food
  Soul Kitchen
  Spanish Masala
  Sweet Bean
  Tadka (not released)
  A Tale of Samurai Cooking
  A Tale of Two Kitchens
  Tampopo
  Theater of Life
  Today's Special
  Tortilla Soup
  A Touch of Spice
  Tsukiji Uogashi Sandaime
  Un Samayal Arayil
  Uncorked (2020)
  Ustad Hotel
  Vatel
  Waitress
  What's Cooking?
  Who Is Killing the Great Chefs of Europe?
  The Wing or the Thigh
  Woman on Top

See also

 List of books about food and drink
 List of documentary films about agriculture
 List of websites about food and drink
 Lists of films
 Outline of film

References

External links
 

 
Food and drink
Food- and drink-related lists